Joseph Rubbo (born July 26, 1963) is an American film actor and television producer best known for his performance as David in the 1982 coming-of-age comedy-drama The Last American Virgin. He is a member of SAG-AFTRA.

Early life 
Rubbo was born in The Bronx, New York.

Career 
One of Rubbo's earliest film roles was as a wrestler in the critically acclaimed 1982 Robin Williams comedy drama The World According to Garp. However, he is most known for co-starring as David in Boaz Davidson's The Last American Virgin (1982) and Arney in the 1985 teen film/sex comedy Hot Chili. He later had a minor role in the 1996 movie Striptease.

Rubbo made numerous television appearances on The Late Show with David Letterman throughout the 1980s, most memorably playing Letterman's stepson "Ray Letterman" in a sketch. Since 2010, he has been the executive producer of VIP Television, an entertainment news/lifestyle program focused on South Florida.

Selected filmography 
 The World According to Garp (1982)
 The Last American Virgin (1982)
 Hot Chili (1985)
 Striptease (1996)

References

External links
 

1963 births
American people of Italian descent
Male actors from New York City
Television producers from New York City
People from the Bronx
Living people